Battle Riot II was a professional wrestling event produced by Major League Wrestling (MLW). It took place on April 5, 2019 at the Melrose Ballroom in New York, New York. The event aired live as a two-hour special episode of Fusion on beIN Sports. It was the second event under the Battle Riot chronology. 

Twelve matches were contested at the event with four matches airing live at Battle Riot. The other seven matches were taped for future episodes of Fusion and one match was a non-televised match. The main event was the 39-man Battle Riot match, in which the winner would earn a future MLW World Heavyweight Championship opportunity. L. A. Park won the Battle Riot to earn the title shot. Also on the card, Teddy Hart retained the World Middleweight Championship against Ace Austin.

Event

Preliminary matches
The event opened with a match in which Teddy Hart defended the World Middleweight Championship against Ace Austin. During the match, The Dynasty provided guest commentary and Hart snatched MJF's champagne then drank it and threw it in the security guard's face. Hart executed a diving Hart Destroyer and then a second Hart Destroyer on Austin for the win to retain the title. After the match, Hart berated MJF during an interview which led MJF to hit Hart with a bottle of champagne thus knocking him out with a concussion.

Next, Minoru Tanaka made his televised MLW debut against Myron Reed. Tanaka pinned Reed with a cradle for the win.

The next match to air on the Battle Riot special was a street fight, in which Tom Lawlor defended the World Heavyweight Championship against Jimmy Havoc. The match was taped at Rise of the Renegades on April 4. Havoc knocked out the referee when the referee warned him about repeatedly using the stapler. Lawlor would then execute a Death Valley Driver to Havoc onto the wood and then nailed an Acid Rainmaker to Havoc onto a chair and covered him for the pinfall but the referee was knocked out. A second referee arrived and then Lawlor hit Havoc with the chair in his jaw twice to win the match and retain the title.

Main event match

The main event was the namesake Battle Riot match, where the winner would earn a World Heavyweight Championship opportunity at any time and any place of his choosing within six months. Maxwell Jacob Friedman was the #1 entrant and Dan Severn was the #2 entrant. Teddy Hart was supposed to be the #16 entrant but he was unable to compete due to concussion suffered from the earlier attack by MJF. The #23 entrant Jacob Fatu attacked several of the competitors along with his Contra Unit teammates Josef Samael and Simon Gotch and poured gas on them which led to the security escorting Fatu away from the ring thus removing him from the match. The assault by Contra Unit allowed MJF to pin Jimmy Yuta, Rey Horus and Kotto Brazil in quick succession. The #26, #27 and #28 entrants were Santana, Ortiz and Konnan respectively. The three members of The Latin American Exchange brawled with The Hart Foundation, which resulted in Brian Pillman Jr. eliminating Santana and Ortiz and a brawl between Harts and LAX led Konnan to leave the ring. The final four participants were L. A. Park (#30), Alexander Hammerstone (#34), Sami Callihan (#35) and Mance Warner (#39). Warner and Hammerstone brawled with each other on the apron and Warner knocked him to eliminate. Hammerstone would then be eliminated by Callihan. Park nailed Callihan with a backbreaker and a spear and then tossed him over the top rope to win the Battle Riot and earn the Golden Ticket.

Results

Battle Riot match entrances and eliminations

References

2019 in professional wrestling
Battle Riot
Events in New York City
April 2019 events in the United States
2019 American television episodes
2010s American television specials